Astrid Lampe (born December 22, 1955 in Tilburg, Netherlands) is a Dutch poet, actor and director. In addition, she teaches students of the Department of Language and Image at Rietveld Academy in Amsterdam.

Works
Lil(zucht) (Lil(sigh)), 2010
Park Slope (K’nex studies), 2008
Mosselman Hallo (Musselman Hello), 2006
Middelburg, 2006
Spuit je ralkleur (Squirt your RALcolour), 2005
De memen van Lara (The Memes of Lara), 2002
De sok weer aan (The Sock On Again), 2000
Rib, 1997

Awards
 2007 - Writer Prize of Brabant Arts
 2006 - Ida Gerhardt Poëzieprijs

References

External links
 Website of Astrid Lampe

1955 births
Living people
Dutch women poets
People from Tilburg